Bernard John Poniatowski (born January 9, 1939) was a Canadian politician. He served in the Legislative Assembly of Saskatchewan from 1978 to 1982, as a NDP member for the constituency of Saskatoon Eastview. He is a teacher.

References

Saskatchewan New Democratic Party MLAs
1939 births
Living people